Lincoln Michel (born 1982) is an American short story writer, novelist, and editor. He is the author of Upright Beasts (Coffee House Press 2015) and The Body Scout (Orbit 2021).

Career 
Lincoln Michel was the co-founder and co-editor of Gigantic (magazine). From 2014 to 2017, he was the Editor-in-Chief of Electric Literature. He is known for his "genre-bending" stories. His short stories have been published in Noon (Literary Annual), The Paris Review, Granta, Tin House, Fantasy and Science Fiction, and The Believer (magazine). He won a 2015 Pushcart Prize.

His debut novel The Body Scout was published in 2021 and received critical acclaim. The New York Times called the novel “timeless and original" and "a wild ride, sad and funny, surreal and intelligent.” Boing Boing described it as "a modern cyberpunk classic." He has taught at the Columbia University School of the Arts and Sarah Lawrence College.

Bibliography

Books 

 Upright Beasts (Coffee House Press, 2015)
 The Body Scout (Orbit Books, 2021)

Anthologies edited 

 Gigantic Worlds (Gigantic Books, 2015)
 Tiny Crimes: Very Short Tales of Mystery and Murder (Catapult, 2018)
 Tiny Nightmares: Very Short Tales of Horror (Catapult, 2020)

References

External links
 Lincoln Michel's author website
 Coffee House Press page for Lincoln Michel

American male short story writers
Living people
1982 births
21st-century American short story writers
21st-century American male writers
American science fiction writers
21st-century American novelists
Weird fiction writers